Divoselo is a village in the Gospić municipality in the Lika region of central Croatia. It is located near Gospić, connected by the D25 highway.

History
During the WWII Genocide of Serbs by the Croatian fascist Ustaše regime, more than 900 Serbs were massacred in Divoselo.

The Serb community was ethnically cleansed from the area during the Operation Medak Pocket (September 1993) of the Croatian War (1991–95), when the Croatian Army took it from the break-away Republic of Serbian Krajina. Earlier, the Battle of Gospić (1991) included firefights between the Yugoslav People's Army and the Croatian National Guard in the village.

Demographics
The 1712–14 census of Lika and Krbava registered 589 inhabitants, all of whom were Serbian Orthodox ("Vlach").

The 1991 census registered 344 residents, out of whom 304 were ethnic Serbs. The 2011 census registered 4 residents.

Notable natives and residents
 Nada Dimić (1923–1942) - antifascist, partisan  and People's Hero of Yugoslavia
 Mile Počuča (1899–1980) - antifascist, partisan  and People's Hero of Yugoslavia

References

Populated places in Lika-Senj County
Serb communities in Croatia